Meet Christopher: An Osage Indian Boy from Oklahoma is a 2008 book by Genevieve Simermeyer for middle school students.

The book tells the story of Christopher Cote who attends the annual In-lon-shka gathering where he and his family celebrate their Osage heritage by dancing, eating, and wearing traditional garments. Christopher also engages in year-round activities to help keep his people's culture vibrant, such as studying the Osage language at a weekly class at his local public library.

Meet Christopher is the fourth book in the National Museum of the American Indian's My World: Young Native Americans Today series. Illustrated with photographs by Katherine Fogden, it won the 2010 American Indian Youth Literature Award for Best Middle School Book. , the author, Genevieve Simermeyer, was the school programs manager for the museum.

References

2008 children's books
2008 non-fiction books
American children's books
American non-fiction books
Books set in the Osage Nation
Literature by Native American women
Native American children's literature